Nalaikh is one of nine Düüregs (districts) of the Mongolian capital of Ulaanbaatar.  It is subdivided into 8 Khoroos (subdistricts).

Unlike most other düüregs, Nalaikh is technically a separate city, but still under the common administration of the capital.

Notable people
Kyokutenho Masaru - sumo wrestler

References 

Districts of Ulaanbaatar
Populated places in Mongolia